Giorgio Mammoliti (born George Mammoliti on September 20, 1961) is a former Canadian politician who represented Ward 7 York West on the Toronto City Council from 2000 to 2018. He ran for mayor of Toronto in 2010. Mammoliti previously represented Yorkview from 1990 to 1995 for the New Democratic Party (NDP) in the Legislative Assembly of Ontario. Prior to entering politics, he worked for the Metro Toronto Housing Authority and was a labour union president.

Background
A landscaper with the then Metro Toronto Housing Authority, he rose to become head of Canadian Union of Public Employees Local 767.

Political career
Mammoliti represented Ward 7 York West, one of the two York West wards. He is a former chair of the Parks & Environment committee and was a member of the mayor's executive committee until he resigned on November 26, 2012, when Rob Ford was found guilty of governmental conflict of interest (due to a complaint regarding Ford's use of city stationery to raise money for his own charity) and ordered removed from office. This order was suspended, and the initial judgement was overturned on appeal. Mammoliti re-joined the executive committee in October 2013. Previously, Mammoliti served as a member of the Legislative Assembly of Ontario from 1990 to 1995. In 2002, he switched names from the anglicized George to the Italian Giorgio. On October 15, 2009, he declared his candidacy for mayor in Toronto's 2010 election. In July, after registering no more than 4% in public opinion polls over several months, Mammoliti withdrew from the mayoral contest in order to stand for re-election as a city councillor. On July 9, 2014, Toronto City Council suspended Mammoliti for three months for holding fundraisers contrary to the Council's code of conduct. On September 15, 2014, police launched an investigation into the matter, though no charges were laid. On October 22, 2018, Mammoliti lost his re-election bid for Toronto City Council.

Ontario Legislature 
At age 28, he ran for the Ontario New Democratic Party in the 1990 provincial election, in the riding of Yorkview. Mammoliti upset Liberal incumbent Claudio Polsinelli by 1,619 votes; the governing Liberals were initially leading in polls but they were beset by several scandals and public cynicism due to an early election call.

The NDP won a majority government and Mammoliti was appointed as parliamentary assistant to the minister responsible for the provincial anti-drug strategy on October 1, 1990. He later served as the parliamentary assistant for two other ministers.

While in the legislature, Mammoliti was one of the strongest critics of same-sex marriage. He said "I believe that children pick up from their parents and if we extend the definition of spouse and open up traditional families, those children will be influenced in a way that we’ll never, ever forget." He was one of 12 NDP MPPs to break ranks and vote against the Rae government's proposed Bill 167, leading to the bill's defeat on June 9, 1994.

In the 1995 provincial election, Mammoliti was defeated by Liberal city councillor Mario Sergio by almost 3,000 votes. Sergio left North York's city council to take his seat in the Ontario Legislature, and Mammoliti decided to run in the by-election to replace him on city council. He was opposed by his old rival Polsinelli, and won the election without difficulty.

In 2018, Mammoliti announced he would re-enter provincial politics, and seek the Progressive Conservative Party of Ontario nomination in Brampton Centre.  Thirteen days later he decided against such a run, citing his "difficult decision to continue to represent the City of Toronto" by remaining in municipal politics.

Toronto City Council 
On city council, he was noted for his unsuccessful attempt to lure a National Hockey League team to North York. When North York and other municipalities were merged to form the new City of Toronto in 1997, Mammoliti was elected to the Toronto City Council. At around the same time, he quit the NDP and joined the Liberal Party (this decision did not affect his standing on council, as all Toronto councillors are elected as independents). On council, his highest profile role was as the chair of the Toronto Zoo. He has also served as Chair of the Affordable Housing Committee, Chair of the Toronto Zoo Board, Co-Chair of Canada Municipalities Housing Action Network – Federation of Canadian Municipalities (FCM), Chair of the City's International Committee, as well as a member of Toronto's Executive Committee.

He also attracted attention due to a bitter dispute with then-councillor Rob Ford. The two represented neighbouring wards and generally represented the right-wing, but were frequently in conflict, generally over Ford's fiscal conservatism, and particularly over Mammoliti's office budgets. In one argument, Ford reportedly called Mammoliti "Gino Boy", which was taken as an anti-Italian slur. As a result of Ford's comment, Mammoliti filled a human rights complaint against Ford. Mammoliti's son Michael filed his papers to run against Ford in the 2003 municipal election but withdrew at the last moment. In 2007, he called for an investigation of Ford and Doug Holyday after they filed total expenses of $0 and $1,471 in 2006, respectively.

Mammoliti was generally considered a right-leaning and socially conservative member of council. He was an outspoken supporter of Toronto Police Chief Julian Fantino, and spearheaded an unsuccessful effort to pressure the Toronto Police Services Board to renew Fantino's contract. In the 2003 election, he supported John Tory's bid to become Mayor of Toronto. On July 28–29, 2011, the executive committee of Toronto City Council heard deputations by 169 Torontonians on the hundreds of millions of dollars in budget cuts suggested by KPMG consultants. Mammoliti claimed there were "very few" worthwhile deputations and described the event as a "socialist party".

In response to the late July executive committee meeting, Mammoliti launched a "Save the City...Support the Ford Administration" Facebook group in August 2011. He indicated that he created the group so that the "taxpayer" would have an opportunity to comment on how municipal taxes should be spent in Toronto and stated: "If you smell like someone who can be a part of the Communist Party you’re not going to be welcome on the site." On August 11, 2011 Mammoliti suggested the "communist movement" hides in the NDP and added that he wants to "weed out the communists in this city."

On October 12, 2013, the Toronto Sun published an op-ed by Mammoliti, opposing plans to build the Finch LRT.

In December 2013, the City of Toronto's integrity commissioner opened an investigation into a $5000-a-table Mammoliti fundraiser attended by lobbyists. The integrity commissioner released a report to Toronto City Council detailing two fundraisers held for Mammoliti which paid him $80,000. On July 9, 2014, Toronto City Council voted to suspend Mammoliti and withhold his salary for three months for holding the fundraisers. City Council also authorized a review of the fundraisers for any criminality.

In June 2014 he angered many people when he suggested Parkdale was a district full of pedophiles. He also suggested that all-ages shows attracted pedophiles.

In a 2017 episode of the television series Political Blind Date, Mammoliti and Matt Brown discussed their differing perspectives on the issue of safe injection sites.

Mayoral campaign

On January 5, 2010, Mammoliti filed his nomination papers at City Hall to run for mayor in the 2010 City of Toronto elections. He unveiled a platform that included building a floating casino, introducing a municipal lottery, reversing tax increases he had he previously voted for and creating a red light district for prostitution as well as an 11 pm curfew for children under the age of 14 and giving guns to by-law enforcement officers. He also promised budget cuts and intended to target the $40 million in annual city grants to arts, cultural and community groups but was opposed to cutting salaries for elected officials. He also called for cars to be banned from the Gardiner Expressway, converting the thoroughfare into a garden, and implementing road tolls.

During his campaign, Mammoliti and fellow mayoral candidate and councillor Rob Ford co-sponsored a motion to deny city funding to the Toronto Gay Pride Parade if it didn't ban the group Queers Against Israeli Apartheid (QuAIA) from participating. Mammoliti also attended the 2010 Toronto Gay Pride Festival where he was shown in a YouTube video to be "stalking" the activity and presence of QuAIA with a video camera he held in the parade.

After campaigning for six months without exceeding single digits in public opinion polls, Mammoliti announced his withdrawal from the contest on July 5, 2010 in order to run for re-election as a city councillor.

On February 4, 2013, the city's compliance audit committee voted to commence legal proceedings against Mammoliti after an audit found his 2010 election campaign exceeded the authorized spending limit by more than $12,000.

Controversies
During the lead-up to the 2018 Toronto municipal election, Mammoliti was criticized by his constituents for likening social housing residents with criminal records to cockroaches in an appearance on the right-wing website The Rebel Media. In an election ad in September 2018, Mammoliti was shown as ready to swing a sledgehammer under the words, "Saving our community begins with knocking down social housing". In a subsequent interview however, the candidate clarified his position: "This ad speaks to two things. First is the sledgehammer because we need to eliminate the segregation at Jane and Finch which has been the poor pocket of the city for 50 years. Four generations of children are angry, segregated and shooting each other. The decrepit housing has mold and needs to come down the way things happened in Regent Park and Lawrence Heights. It’s our turn now".

Mammoliti refused to apologize after being asked in a debate by opposing candidate Tiffany Ford, and went online to attack Ford on her own campaign Facebook page. "At least I have a plan to take you out of segregation, a white man does. Your black candidates don’t speak of how they will do that. They will just keep you bottled up in a poverty, segregated world with no hope. Wake up!!!!!", he had written.

Move to Wasaga Beach
In 2018, Mammoliti moved to Wasaga Beach. In 2022, he ran for mayor of the town, but lost.

Electoral record

References

External links

1961 births
Canadian people of Italian descent
Ontario New Democratic Party MPPs
Toronto city councillors
Living people
Politicians from Simcoe County